The multiplication sign, also known as the times sign or the dimension sign, is the symbol , used in mathematics to denote the multiplication operation and its resulting product. While similar to a lowercase X, the form is properly a four-fold rotationally symmetric saltire.

History
The earliest known use of the  symbol to represent multiplication appears in an anonymous appendix to the 1618 edition of John Napier's . This appendix has been attributed to William Oughtred, who used the same symbol in his 1631 algebra text, stating:"Multiplication of species [i.e. unknowns] connects both proposed magnitudes with the symbol 'in' or : or ordinarily without the symbol if the magnitudes be denoted with one letter." Two earlier uses of a  notation have been identified, but do not stand critical examination.

Uses
In mathematics, the symbol × has a number of uses, including
 Multiplication of two numbers, where it is read as "times" or "multiplied by"
 Cross product of two vectors, where it is usually read as "cross"
 Cartesian product of two sets, where it is usually read as "cross"
 Geometric dimension of an object, such as noting that a room is 10 feet × 12 feet in area, where it is usually read as "by" (e.g., "10 feet by 12 feet")
 Screen resolution in pixels, such as 1920 pixels across × 1080 pixels down. Read as "by".
 Dimensions of a matrix, where it is usually read as "by"
 A statistical interaction between two explanatory variables, where it is usually read as "by"

In biology, the multiplication sign is used in a botanical hybrid name, for instance Ceanothus papillosus × impressus (a hybrid between C. papillosus and C. impressus) or Crocosmia × crocosmiiflora (a hybrid between two other species of Crocosmia). However, the communication of these hybrid names with a Latin letter "x" is common, when the actual "×" symbol is not readily available.

The multiplication sign is also used by historians for an event between two dates. When employed between two dates for example 1225 and 1232 the expression "1225×1232" means "no earlier than 1225 and no later than 1232".

A monadic  symbol is used by the APL programming language to denote the sign function.

Similar notations 

The lower-case Latin letter  is sometimes used in place of the multiplication sign. This is considered incorrect in mathematical writing.

Other symbols can also be used to denote multiplication, often to reduce confusion between the multiplication sign × and the common variable . In some countries, such as Germany, the primary symbol for multiplication is the "dot operator"  (as in ). This notation is used wherever multiplication should be written explicitly, such as in " for "; this usage is also seen in English-language texts.

Historically, computer language syntax was restricted to the ASCII character set, and the asterisk  became the de facto symbol for the multiplication operator.

Typing the character

Unicode and HTML entities
 
Other variants and related characters:
 
  (a zero-width space indicating multiplication)
  (the interpunct, may be easier to type than the dot operator)
 
 
 
 
 
  (intended to explicitly denote the cross product of two vectors)

See also
 Division sign
 List of mathematical symbols
 Plus and minus signs
 Reference mark
 X mark

References

External links

Mathematical symbols
Multiplication